Manuela Kormann (born 7 December 1976 in Bern; also known as Manuela Netzer-Kormann) is a Swiss curler. She is currently a national coach with the Swiss Curling Association.

Kormann started playing curling in 1986. She plays in third position or as a skip and is right-handed.

References

External links

1976 births
Living people
Sportspeople from Bern
Swiss female curlers
Curlers at the 2006 Winter Olympics
Olympic silver medalists for Switzerland
Olympic curlers of Switzerland
Olympic medalists in curling
Medalists at the 2006 Winter Olympics
European curling champions
Swiss curling champions
Swiss curling coaches
21st-century Swiss women